Richardson Stadium is a stadium in Davidson, North Carolina. It is home to the Davidson Wildcats football, lacrosse, and track and field teams.

The stadium incorporates both Stephen B. Smith Field and Irwin Belk Track. Richardson Stadium has a capacity for 6,000 people.

Overview 
It has also hosted the NCAA Men's Soccer Championship on three occasions from 1992 to 1994. Every autumn the stadium acts as the start and finish of the Davidson freshman Cake Race, where incoming students run a course around the college in competition for cakes baked by inhabitants of the local community.  The facility opened in 1926 after being donated to the college by Lunsford Richardson Jr., Davidson class of 1914, and his brother Henry Smith Richardson, Davidson class of 1906, in memory of their father, Lunsford Richardson Sr., Davidson class of 1875.  It was later renovated in 1998 and again in 2005 with the latter providing upgraded amenities including expanded seating, a new press box, weight room, and visitor's locker room.

Occasionally the stadium will host Charlotte Eagles Lamar Hunt U.S. Open Cup matches when their stadium is not big enough for demand.

See also
List of NCAA Division I FCS football stadiums

References

External links
 

Athletics (track and field) venues in North Carolina
College football venues
College track and field venues in the United States
College lacrosse venues in the United States
Davidson Wildcats football
Multi-purpose stadiums in the United States
Lacrosse venues in North Carolina
Soccer venues in North Carolina
Sports venues in North Carolina
Sports venues in Mecklenburg County, North Carolina
1923 establishments in North Carolina
Sports venues completed in 1923